The 2016–17 season was Fenerbahçe's 59th consecutive season in the Süper Lig and their 109th year in existence.

Season overview

Kits 

Supplier: Adidas
Main sponsor: Nesine.com
Main sponsor (Europe): Borajet Airlines

Back sponsor: Halley
Sleeve sponsor: Coca-Cola

Short sponsor: Integral Forex
Socks sponsor: Astra Group

Transfers

In

Out

Total spending:  €6.10M

Total income:  €8.50M

Expenditure:  €2.40M

First team squad

Statistics

Overall

Pre-season and friendlies

Pre-season

Mid-season

Süper Lig

League table

Results summary

Pld = Matches played; W = Matches won; D = Matches drawn; L = Matches lost; GF = Goals for; GA = Goals against; GD = Goal difference; Pts = Points

Results by round

Matches

Turkish Cup

Group stage

Group C

Matches

Knockout phase

Round of 16

Quarter-finals

Semi-finals

UEFA Champions League

Third qualifying round

UEFA Europa League

Play-off round

Group stage

Matches

Round of 32

See also
 2016–17 Süper Lig
 2016–17 Turkish Cup
 2016–17 UEFA Champions League
 2016–17 UEFA Europa League

Notes

References

Fenerbahçe S.K. (football) seasons
Fenerbahce
Fenerbahce